The Standard Vanguard is a car which was produced by the Standard Motor Company in Coventry, England, from 1947 until 1963.

The car was announced in July 1947, was completely new, with no resemblance to the previous models, and, designed in 1945, it was Standard's first post-World War II car and intended for export around the world. It was also the first model to carry the new Standard badge, which was a heavily stylised representation of the wings of a griffin.

In the wake of World War II, many potential customers in the UK and in English-speaking export markets had recently experienced several years of military or naval service, and therefore a car name related to the Royal Navy carried a greater resonance than it would for later generations. The name of the Standard Vanguard recalled HMS Vanguard, the last of the Royal Navy's battleships, launched in 1944 amid much media attention; permission to use the name involved Standard in extensive negotiations with senior Royal Navy personnel.

The Vanguard was first exhibited to the public at the Brussels Motor Show in February 1948. It began to come off the assembly lines in the middle of 1948 but all production was allotted to the export trade. An estate car and a utility pick up version were announced in September, and then a 12 cwt delivery van. Aprons were fitted over the Vanguard's rear wheels from September 1949.

In 1950, the Vanguard and the Triumph Renown were the first cars to be fitted with a Laycock de Normanville overdrive. The Laycock overdrive operated on the second and third gears of the three-speed transmission, creating, in effect, a five-speed gearbox.

In Scandinavia, Standard marketed the Standard Ten saloon as the Vanguard Junior.

Vanguard Phase I

Chassis and running gear 
The car used a conventional chassis on which was mounted the slab sided body. Suspension was independent at the front with coil springs, and a live axle and leaf springs at the rear. Front and rear anti-roll bars were fitted. The brakes were cable driven with 9-inch (228 mm) drums all round, and to make the most of the interior space a column gear change was used initially on the right of the steering wheel then later on the left.

Engine 
The same wet liner engine was used throughout the range until the advent of the Six model in 1960, and was an overhead-valve unit of  bore and  stroke with single Solex downdraught carburettor. The compression ratio was 6.7:1. Wet cylinder liners were fitted. The engine was essentially the same as that made by Standard for the Ferguson TE20 tractor, with some changes for automobile use.

Transmission 
At first, the transmission included a three-speed gearbox with synchromesh on all forward ratios, controlled using a column-mounted lever. The option of Laycock-de-Normanville overdrive was announced at the end of 1949 and became available in June 1950, priced for UK buyers at slightly under £45 including purchase tax. Laycock overdrives were cable operated on top gear until 1954 when an electric solenoid was added.

Broadening the range of available bodies 
An estate car joined the range in 1950 and, for Belgium only, some convertibles were made by the Impéria coach-building company.

Road test data 
The test car cost £671 including taxes.

Commercial 
In line with the post-war British export drive, virtually the total output was exported for the first two years of production and only in 1950 did significant home market deliveries start. The Vanguard was intended to achieve export sales, with a particular focus on Australia. During the immediate post-war period, cars were in short supply, creating a "seller's market".  Restricted availability of the Vanguard helped attract willing buyers.

Closer to home, in the slowly recovering West German market the Standard Vanguard recorded 405 sales in 1950, making it the country's third most popular imported automobile, in a list otherwise featuring much smaller cars from French and Italian manufacturers.   In fact, the Vanguard sales in 1950 accounted for more than 70% of the British cars sold in West Germany that year, customers of other UK manufacturers having reportedly been caught out in the late 1940s by the lack of a dealer network and difficulties in obtaining replacement parts.

Phase IA - 1952 facelift
The body was updated in 1952 with a lowered bonnet line, a wider rear window and a new grille featuring a wide horizontal chrome bar in place of the narrow, more closely packed slats of the original grille. This became known as the Phase 1A.

Vanguard Phase II

The Swiss importer for the Vanguard was an energetic firm called AMAG, which later took on the Swiss Volkswagen franchise. AMAG themselves assembled the Swiss market Phase I Vanguards, and it was at the Geneva Motor Show in March 1953 that an extensive re-design was unveiled:  the Phase II Vanguard was of a contemporary Ponton three-box "notch-back" design. Boot/trunk capacity increased by 50% in comparison to that of the Phase I, and visibility was improved with a further enlarged rear window. A new, extended, grille now encompassed the parking lights.

Mechanically there were few changes, but the clutch changed from cable to hydraulic operation and the engine compression ratio increased to 7.2:1. The previously fitted anti-roll bar was no longer used. Wider 6.00x16 tyres were fitted to improve road holding.

In February 1954 Standard became the first British car maker to offer a diesel engine as a factory fitted option. The chassis was stiffened to take the weight of the heavier engine and performance suffered with  about the top speed. Like the petrol engines, the diesel was a Standard-built "20C" engine developed for the Ferguson tractor. The diesels fitted to the tractor were restricted to 2200 rpm and developed , but road-going engines in Vanguards had no limiter and so produced  at 3800 rpm. However, they retained the tractor's "Ki-Gass", de-compressor and over-fuelling systems, all of which had to be manually operated when starting the engine from cold. 1,973 diesel Vanguards were made.

The test car, which had overdrive, cost £1099 including taxes.

For 1955, the Australian-built coupé utility was given a re-styled tail which resulted in extra room in the cargo area. It also featured a new full-width rear window and improved cabin features. As the coupe utility variant of the Phase III style was not yet available, an updated Phase II utility was offered in 1956 with a mesh grille, two-tone paint and new interior trim.

Vanguard Phase III & Vanguard Sportsman

The Phase III, released to the market for the mid-October 1955 British International Motor Show, was a radical change with the elimination of the separate chassis. There was an overlap in availability of the old model with the Phase II estate continuing into 1956.

UK fuel was no longer restricted to the 72 octane "Pool petrol" of the 1940s and early 1950s, and with the modest increases in available octane levels, the Vanguard's compression ratio was increased to 7.0:1. The  engine with its single Solex downdraught carburettor now produced .

The front suspension was independent, using coil springs, and was bolted to a substantial sub-frame which also carried the recirculating ball steering gear. Semi-elliptic leaf springs were used on the rear axle. Lockheed hydraulic brakes with  drums were fitted front and rear. The three-speed gearbox had a column change and the optional overdrive was operated by a switch on the steering column. A four-speed floor change became an option.

The new body was lower and had an increased glass area, making it look much more modern, and the old two-piece flat windscreen gave way to a one-piece curved design. A heater was now a standard fitting. Bench seats were fitted in front and rear with folding centre arm rests. They were covered in Vynide, with leather available as an option.

The car was lighter than the superseded model, and the gearing was changed to deliver better economy with performance virtually unchanged.

A car with overdrive was tested by the British magazine The Motor in 1956. The test car cost £998 including taxes.

For 1957, the Australian-produced Phase III was given a facelift with a new mesh grille. In addition the sedan now sported fins on the rear guards.

Vanguard Sportsman
A performance model, the Vanguard Sportsman, intended to be badged as the Triumph Renown until shortly before launch, was announced in August 1956 with a tuned  engine having similar features to the Triumph TR3 sports car. These included an increased compression ratio to 8.0:1, twin SU carburettors, and improved pistons. However, the Sportsman's inlet manifold and carburettors sat at a different angle from those of the TR3, and its engine had the same 85 mm bore as the Vanguard's, not the 83 mm bore of the TR3.  The final-drive ratio was lowered to 4.55:1 to give better acceleration, and larger  drums fitted to the brakes. The standard version had a bench front seat but separate seats were an option.

Although sharing the same basic body shell with the other Vanguard variations, the Sportsman had design variations, including a squarer front grille, which gave the car a slightly higher, squarer appearance than the regular models.

Just 901 examples of the Sportsman model were made up to 1958. Sportsmans then became available to special order, and around another fifty (mostly estate cars) were built between 1958 and 1960. A small number were built before the Vignale makeover in 1958. Popular Classics magazine's test of a Sportsman in 1994 stated that a total of 962 were built.

The test car cost £1231 including taxes.

Standard Ensign and Ensign De Luxe

A basic model, the Standard Ensign, with 1670 cc engine, was announced in October 1957 restyled by Michelotti.  The Ensign shared its body with the Vanguard Series III, but had a cheapened specification in various respects, including a mesh front grille and a simplified instrument panel and dashboard. Despite the generally lower specification, the Ensign was the first Vanguard-based car to have a four-speed gearbox. The gear lever was moved from the column to the floor, and overdrive was optional. Many were bought for company fleets and for the armed forces. Production ceased in 1961 with 18,852 examples having been produced. Production included 901 Mk II versions, produced only in 1961.

An Ensign De Luxe version followed in 1962 and 1963 with a larger 2138 cc engine. Unlike the smaller-engined original version, the De Luxe was also available as an estate car.

A 1670 cc Ensign was tested by the British magazine The Motor in 1958. The test car cost £899 including taxes of £300.

In January 1960 a diesel engined Ensign was announced, featuring the compact "P4C" 1.6 litre four-cylinder engine produced by specialists Perkins of Peterborough.

Vanguard Vignale

A face-lift of the Phase III was designed by Italian stylist Giovanni Michelotti and coach-builders Vignale in 1958, and was introduced at the October 1958 Earls Court Motor Show. The windscreen and rear window were deeper, and there was a revised grill and trim. A floor change four-speed manual gearbox was now fitted, and the provision of a three-speed gear box with column change offered as an option. An overdrive was also offered an option, as was an automatic. One automatic car is known to have survived - there may be others.

The car had front and rear bench seats, which were covered, as standard, in Vynide. Leather was an option on the home market and cloth for exported models. A heater and (unusual for the time) electric windscreen washers were factory fitted, although a radio remained an option.

A Vignale with overdrive was tested by the British magazine The Motor in 1959. The test car cost £1147 including taxes of £383.

Vanguard Six

Introduced at the end of 1960, the last of the Vanguards featured a six-cylinder 1,998 cc engine with push-rod overhead valves: this was the engine subsequently installed in the Triumph 2000. Externally the only differences from the Vignale were the badging but the interior was updated.

Australian production included coupe utility and van variants. Early in the model run the rear lights of the coupe utility were changed from a vertical to a horizontal layout with a different rear body side panel.

A Vanguard Six was tested by the British magazine The Motor in 1960. The test car cost £1021 including taxes of £301.

Replacement and end of Standard
Leyland Motors took over Standard-Triumph in 1960 and the prototype Triumph 2000 progressed with new money, the engine being used by the Vanguard Six from 1961 to early 1963. The six was lighter than the old four and was a development based on the Standard Ten unit.

Both the Ensign and the Vanguard were replaced in 1963 by the Triumph 2000, and the Standard name disappeared from the British market after 60 years.

Vanguard Utility 

In 1950, the Australian subsidiary of the Standard Motor Company introduced a coupé utility version of the Vanguard Phase I. It was fitted with the same 2088 cc four-cylinder engine as used in the saloon. Utility versions of the Vanguard were produced in Australia over the following years, with production ending in 1964.

The Vanguard Utility was sold in the UK as a pickup truck. The main purchaser was the Royal Air Force, which had them in Phase I and II form. The Phase II commercials remained available until 1958, when they were replaced by the Phase 3. Around 50 phase 3 pickups went to Welsh Water and the workshop manual pictures a pickup with a body by Awson. A gown van and a breakdown tender are shown in the brochure.

Sales in the UK were modest, mostly due to stiff competition from the British Motor Corporation and from Standard's other commercial vehicles including the 5 cwt and later 7 cwt vehicles. With the discontinuation of the Vanguard Utility, the only commercial vehicle produced by the company was the Standard Atlas, and so that was the Vanguard Utility's replacement, but they did share some common parts.

Die-Cast models

 Dinky Toys made a model of the Phase I.
 Corgi Toys included a model of the Phase III saloon in their range from 1957 to 1961 as model No 207. Additionally, a Phase III saloon presented as a Royal Air Force Staff Car was available from 1958 to 1962 as model No 352.

Notes

References

External links

Standard Motor Club
Vanguard Phase III Owners club

Vanguard
Cars introduced in 1947
Cars discontinued in 1963
Sedans
Rear-wheel-drive vehicles
1950s cars
1960s cars